Wang Chau is an area of Yuen Long District, located in the northwestern part of Hong Kong, west of the Shan Pui River.

Geography
Wang Chau comprises two hills: Kai Shan and Chu Wong Ling. Chu Wong Ling includes a shrub covered hillock.

Villages
Wang Chau comprises several villages:
 The "Six Villages of Wang Chau"
 Tung Tau Wai
 Chung Sum Wai, a walled village
 Sai Tau Wai
 Fuk Hing Tsuen
 Yeung Uk Tsuen
 Lam Uk Tsuen
 Ng Uk Tsuen
 Tai Tseng Wai, a walled village
 Shing Uk Tsuen
 "Waterside area"
 Shui Pin Wai, a walled village
 Shui Pin Tsuen
 Shui Tin Tsuen
 Fung Chi Tsuen
 Ha Mei San Tsuen
 Wing Ning Tsuen
 Fung Ka Wai

Housing
Long Ping Estate is a mixed public/TPS estate in Wang Chau.

Public housing programme controversy

Within days of the 2016 legislative elections and the decisive victory of Eddie Chu in the New Territories West constituency, Chu made allegations that the government was in collusion with business interests, rural kingpins and Triads about the planned development of public housing on the Wang Chau site. Although CY Leung initially attempted to blame Financial Secretary John Tsang and Chief Secretary Carrie Lam, leaked internal government meeting minutes directly implicated CY Leung in a decision to defer to the interests of Heung Yee Kuk leaders by scaling down the planned housing development in Wang Chau from 13,000 units to 4000 units, razing a greenfield site whilst avoiding brownfield site illegally occupied by the Chairman of the rural committee in Shap Pat Heung.

On 21 September 2016, the government held a press conference responding to recent concerns over the public housing program in Wang Chau. Chief Executive CY Leung stated that it was his decision to implement the first phase of the program in which 4,000 units would be provided.

Sights
Several historic buildings are located in Wang Chau, including:
 I Shing Temple, in Tung Tau Wai. Built in 1718, it is dedicated to Hung Shing and Che Kung. It was declared a monument in 1996.
 Yu Yuen, in Tung Tau Wai, was built in 1927 as a summer villa. It is listed as a Grade I Historic Building.
 Tin Hau Temple in Ng Uk Village. It was rebuilt in 1981.

Transport
Wang Chau is located between the Tin Shui Wai and Long Ping stations of the MTR.

Education
Wang Chau is in Primary One Admission (POA) School Net 73. Within the school net are multiple aided schools (operated independently but funded with government money) and one government school: South Yuen Long Government Primary School (南元朗官立小學).

See also
 Yuen Long Industrial Estate
 Kai Shan, a hill in Wang Chau
 Fung Lok Wai, an area of fish ponds located north of Wang Chau

References

Further reading

External links